The King's Head is a Grade II listed pub in Bristol, England.

It is on the Campaign for Real Ale's National Inventory of Historic Pub Interiors.

It was built in the mid-17th century, refurbished about 1865, with later 19th and 20th-century additions.

References

Grade II listed pubs in Bristol
National Inventory Pubs
Pubs in Gloucestershire